Graeme Linke (born 17 November 1951) is a former Australian rules footballer who played with  Geelong and Footscray in the Victorian Football League (VFL) as well as Woodville in the South Australian National Football League (SANFL).

Linke, a defender often used at fullback, came to Geelong from Hawkesdale. He played 38 senior games for Geelong in four seasons, then went to Woodville for two years, before returning to Victoria and signing with Footscray. His career at Footscray was short, with one game in 1977 and four in 1978. He then played for Geelong Amateur in the Victorian Amateur Football Association and won the C Grade competition's best and fairest award in 1979.

References

1951 births
Australian rules footballers from Victoria (Australia)
Geelong Football Club players
Western Bulldogs players
Woodville Football Club players
Living people